Silent Men is a 1933 American Pre-Code Western film directed by D. Ross Lederman and starring Tim McCoy.

Cast
 Tim McCoy as Tim Richards
 Florence Britton as Gwen Wilder
 J. Carrol Naish as Jack Wilder (as J. Carroll Naish)
 Wheeler Oakman as Ed Wilder
 Matthew Betz as Carl Lawler
 William V. Mong as Lawyer Oscar Sikes
 Joseph W. Girard as Two Block Burkett (as Joseph Girard)
 Syd Saylor as "Coyote Carter" (as Sid Saylor)

References

External links
 

1933 films
1933 Western (genre) films
American Western (genre) films
American black-and-white films
1930s English-language films
Films directed by D. Ross Lederman
Columbia Pictures films
1930s American films